Alvin Ceccoli (born 5 August 1974) is an Australian footballer who played for three A-League clubs (Sydney FC, Central Coast Mariners and Adelaide United) and was capped internationally for Australia.

Club career
Alvin Ceccoli is of Sammarinese heritage. Alvin started his National Soccer League (NSL) career at Wollongong Wolves in 1995 as a 21-year-old. He played 156 matches in the National Soccer League, punctuated by a short stint in Greece with AEK Athens FC. He won successive NSL Championships with Wollongong in 1998/99 and 1999/2000 before joining Parramatta Power, becoming part of the losing grand final side in 2003/04.

He was one of seven players signed by Sydney FC from the defunct NSL. Ceccoli's first season at the glamour club was a rebirth for his career. Alvin not only became one of the strongest defenders in the league, but also earned his second national team cap against Bahrain in a qualifying match for the Asian Cup in 2007, as a reward for an excellent season with Sydney FC. During the second season with Sydney however, he had some disagreements with new coach Terry Butcher which soured his relationship with the club, and he sought a move elsewhere.

A transfer to Japanese second division team Avispa Fukuoka allowed him to reunite with former Sydney coach Pierre Littbarski, and was formally released by Sydney on 16 January 2007. He spent close to a year at Avispa and was released at the end of the season.

On 3 January 2008 Ceccoli signed a contract for the remainder of the A-League season with Central Coast Mariners FC as cover for Dean Heffernan, his contract running until after the 2008 Grand Final on 25 February. Ceccoli agreed on 20 January 2008 to sign with rival A-League club Adelaide United for their 2008 AFC Champions League campaign beginning in March. It would be his third A-League club in as many years, but was notably absent from Adelaide's first two ACL matches. On 20 March 2008 it was revealed he had left the club to return home to Wollongong to be close to his young family. Staying locally, he has joined Illawarra Premier League club Dandaloo FC for 2008. In 2015, he was selected in Sydney FC's team of the decade.

After leading Corrimal Rangers FC to Grand Final glory in the 2019 season of the Illawarra Premier League Ceccoli decided to retire due to ongoing injury problems. He is held in high regard in the Illawarra region as a pioneer of local football. Ceccoli now takes on an Assistant Coach role alongside Roger Jonovski at Corrimal Rangers focusing on youth development pathways.

Career statistics

Club

International 

International goals

Honours
With Central Coast Mariners:
 A-League Premiership: 2007–2008
With Sydney FC:
 A-League Championship: 2005–2006
 Oceania Club Championship: 2004–2005
With Wollongong Wolves:
 NSL Championship: 1999–2000, 2000–2001
 Oceania Club Championship: 2000–2001

References

External links
 Oz Football profile

1974 births
Living people
Soccer players from Sydney
Australian soccer players
A-League Men players
National Soccer League (Australia) players
J2 League players
Adelaide United FC players
AEK Athens F.C. players
Avispa Fukuoka players
Central Coast Mariners FC players
Parramatta Power players
Sydney FC players
Wollongong Wolves FC players
Australian people of Sammarinese descent
1998 OFC Nations Cup players
Australian expatriate soccer players
Australia international soccer players
Expatriate footballers in Japan
Expatriate footballers in Greece
Australian expatriate sportspeople in Japan
Australian expatriate sportspeople in Greece
Association football fullbacks
Wollongong United FC players